Fur is a thick growth of hair that covers the skin of many animals.

Fur may also refer to:

Arts and entertainment
Fur (Archie Bronson Outfit album), 2004
Fur, an English rock band
Fur (Jane Wiedlin album), 1988
Fur (film), 2006
"Fur", a 2010 episode of Haven (season 1)
The Fur, a 2004 novel by Nathan Hobby

People and language
Fur (surname)
Für, a Hungarian surname
Fur people, an ethnic group of Sudan
Fur languages
Fur language

Places
Fur (island), in Denmark
Fur Formation, a geologic feature
Fur, Sweden

Other uses
Fur clothing
Ferric uptake regulator family, in molecular biology
Furin, a protein
Heraldic fur, a type of heraldry pattern
Fur, a genus of flies in the family Empididae, synonym of Dolichocephala
Fur, a genus of fishes in the family Triakidae, synonym of Furgaleus

See also

Fake fur (disambiguation)
Furr (disambiguation)
Furs (disambiguation)
Furry (disambiguation)
Fir, a genus of trees
Furring, thin strips of wood in construction

Language and nationality disambiguation pages